Peter Hetherston (born 6 November 1964) is a Scottish former professional footballer who played as a midfielder.

Career
Hetherston played over 350 league matches during his seventeen-year playing career, appearing for eight different clubs. Hetherston was appointed as manager of Raith Rovers in 1999, spending two years with Rovers before resigning in December 2001.
In May 2002, Hetherston was appointed manager of Albion Rovers, releasing fifteen players just a week later. Hetherston faced a charge in November 2003 for making sexist remarks about women in football and promptly resigned after another charge three weeks later.

Hetherston – who is now a publican – was one of a number of players who featured in the 2001 film A Shot at Glory, starring Robert Duvall and Michael Keaton.

Family
Peter's younger brother, Brian, was also a talented midfielder. During his career he played for St Mirren and Raith Rovers as well as representing Scotland at Under-21 level. In 1997, he was diagnosed with epilepsy but managed to continue with his career. He died at his home in Coatbridge, Scotland on 4 March 2006 from a suspected epileptic seizure. He was 29 years old.

Honours

Player
Falkirk
 Scottish First Division: 1
 1990–91

Raith Rovers
 Scottish First Division: 1
 1992–93

Aberdeen
 Scottish League Cup: 1
 1995–96

Manager
Raith Rovers
Fife Cup 1999-2000

References

External links
 
 

1964 births
Living people
Scottish footballers
Association football midfielders
Falkirk F.C. players
Watford F.C. players
Sheffield United F.C. players
Raith Rovers F.C. players
Aberdeen F.C. players
Airdrieonians F.C. (1878) players
Partick Thistle F.C. players
Queen of the South F.C. players
Scottish Football League players
English Football League players
Footballers from Bellshill
Scottish football managers
Raith Rovers F.C. managers
Albion Rovers F.C. managers
Scottish Football League managers
Publicans